Valeriy Berezovskiy (born 23 July 1975) is a retired Kyrgyzstani international football player who played for the Kyrgyzstan national football team.

Career statistics

International

Statistics accurate as of match played 9 May 2008

International goals
Scores and results list Kyrgyzstan's goal tally first.

Honors
Alga Bishkek
 Kyrgyzstan League (1): 1992
 Kyrgyzstan Cup (1): 1992
Alga-PVO Bishkek
 Kyrgyzstan Cup (1): 1997
SKA-PVO Bishkek
 Kyrgyzstan League (1): 2000
 Kyrgyzstan Cup (3): 1998, 1999, 2000
Dordoi-Dynamo Naryn
 Kyrgyzstan League (4): 2004, 2005, 2006, 2007
 Kyrgyzstan Cup (3): 2004, 2005, 2006

References

Kyrgyzstani footballers
1974 births
Living people
Sportspeople from Bishkek
Kyrgyzstani people of Russian descent
Association football forwards
Kyrgyz Premier League players
Kyrgyzstan international footballers
FC Kyzylzhar players
FC Zhetysu players
FC Alga Bishkek players